The Abu Dhabi Urban Planning Council (UPC) is the strategic planning agency for the Abu Dhabi (emirate), which supports the realisation of Abu Dhabi Vision 2030 through the creation and continuing evolution of an Emirate-wide strategic framework plan.  Chaired by His Highness Sheikh Mohammed bin Zayed Al Nahyan, Crown Prince of Abu Dhabi and Chairman of the Abu Dhabi Executive Council, the Abu Dhabi Urban Planning Council is responsible for defining the shape of the Emirate, along with the associated land uses, to ensure the development of a professionally designed, sustainable and well-managed urban environment, which incorporate world-class transport and infrastructure systems and support the implementation of Economic Vision 2030 and Environment Vision 2030. Abu Dhabi Quality and Conformity Council (ADQCC) and Abu Dhabi Agriculture & Food Safety Authority were established later under UPC to establish the regulations that help UAE in achieving its vision.

The Abu Dhabi Urban Planning Council's primary purpose is to deliver the vision of His Highness Sh weeikh Khalifa bin Zayed Al Nahyan, President of the UAE, and ruler of Abu Dhabi for the continued fulfillment of the grand design envisaged by the late Sheikh Zayed bin Sultan Al Nahyan and the ongoing evolution of Abu Dhabi as a global capital city.

The mandate of the UPC is five-fold and Emirate-wide:

 Develop comprehensive plans for blocks, neighbourhoods, districts and regions, both for the creation of new communities and the revitalisation of existing communities. 
  
 Assist in the implementation of all plans created by guiding, monitoring and working with those responsible for implementation.  
  
 Develop regulations, guidelines and policies that will help guide planning and development. 
  
 Review and assess major strategic developments to ensure alignment with Plans Capital 2030, Al Ain 2030, Al Gharbia 2030 and Maritime 2030, and in compliance with internal and external plans, and policies, regulations and guidelines. 
  
 Ensure Estidama principles of sustainability are embedded – based on Estidama's four pillars (Environmental, Economic, Social and Cultural) – and are incorporated into the built and natural environment through the mandatory Estidama Pearl Rating System.

Vision 2030: Towards a Sustainable Future 

The UPC has created a clear hierarchy for guiding the activities of the UPC forward. Vision 2030 is the ultimate goal and is articulated through a set of overarching principles. These are based on the four pillars of Estidama, which sits at the core of Vision 2030, to ensure a holistic approach to sustainable development. The overarching principles were developed to guide the preparation of all of the UPC's plans, policies, standards and guidelines, which form the remaining layers of the hierarchy.

They primarily focus on:
Creating a sustainable Emirate that protects resources for current and future generations;
Supporting and enabling economic diversification and growth;
Raising the standard of living across the Emirate;
Protecting, enhancing and promoting Arab and Emirate culture and traditions; and
Embracing contemporary living and respecting the diverse cultures of those residing in Abu Dhabi.

Emirate-wide Framework Plans 

Flowing from the overarching principles is a set of key directions that underpin the realisation of Vision 2030 and form the basis for all plans. The first framework plan – ‘Plan Capital 2030’ – was launched in 2007 and was ground-breaking in both scale and approach. Since then, the UPC has gone on to prepare other regional framework plans – Plan Al Ain 2030 and Plan Al Gharbia 2030 to ensure the continued development of the Emirate as a whole, and Plan Maritime 2030 for Abu Dhabi's coastal areas and waterways. Each plan is updated periodically to ensure it remains relevant and effective in delivering Vision 2030.

To support the implementation of the plans and fulfil its mandate, the UPC created the Complete Sustainable Communities (CSC) initiative. It is a comprehensive suite of policies, regulations and manuals, which enables planners to design communities that are flexible enough to meet the diverse needs of both current and future residents, visitors and businesses, and enhance quality of life by incorporating a range of housing options, community facilities and public spaces that are well-connected, safe and sustainable.

Implementation: Explained 

While the UPC's mandate does not incorporate the implementation of the plans it prepares, nor the development of any Projects or Master Plans it approves through its ‘Development Review Streamline’ process, it works collaboratively with each developer to ensure their plans meet the UPC's requirements, and then the developer is responsible for their implementation.  In simple terms, the UPC will approve plans, and the developer will build based on those approved plans.

Development Review Streamline: Plans Defined 

There are two review streams as part of the UPC Development Review Streamline (DRS) process. A Master Plan is defined as separated multiple buildings, with a road network and community facilities, which must meet certain requirements and standards based on the size of the development.  A Project is defined as a single building with no road network, but can include multiple buildings connected by a podium, and requires no community facilities.

The UPC is responsible for reviewing and approving Master Plans and Projects within the Emirate.  Early proactive coordination between the applicant and the UPC assists to establish whether a development must proceed through the UPC Development Review Stream or whether the development can proceed directly to Estidama and the local approving municipality – in whose boundaries the development is located.

See also
 Leadership in Energy and Environmental Design
 Estidama

External links
 Official website

Economy of the Emirate of Abu Dhabi
Government agencies of Abu Dhabi